= Terms of German Surrender =

Terms of German Surrender may refer to:

- Armistice of 11 November 1918 to end the First World War (Great War at the time)
- German Instrument of Surrender to end Second World War in Europe
